Thika Queens FC, is a Kenyan professional women's football club based in Thika, Kiambu County, Kenya, that competes in Kenyan Women's Premier League, the top tier of Kenyan football.

The club has won the Premier League title on three occasions in 2014–15, 2016–17 and 2020–21 seasons. The club is affiliated to men's team of Thika United who have been playing in the Kenya Premier League.

Honours

Domestic 
League titles

 Kenyan Women's Premier League

 Winners (record) (3): 2014–15, 2016–17, 2020–21

Managerial history 

  Richard Kanyi  (–May 2017)

  Benta Achieng (May 2017–)

See also 

 Vihiga Queens

 Kenyan Women's Premier League

References

External links 

 Thika Queens on Twitter

 Vihiga Queens on Instagram
 Vihiga Queens on Facebook

Women's football clubs in Kenya